The Faroe Islands national football team represents the Faroe Islands in association football and is governed by the Faroe Islands Football Association (FSF). The FSF became a member of FIFA in 1988 and UEFA in 1990 and represents the fourth-smallest UEFA country by population.

The team has never advanced to the finals of the FIFA World Cup or UEFA European Championship. They took part in the Island Games in 1989 and 1991 and won both tournaments. The team also took part in the Nordic Football Championship for the first time in 2000–01, the last time the competition was played. In the Faroe Islands, the team is known as the landsliðið. Home matches are played at Tórsvøllur.

History

Early years (1930–1988)
From 1930 to 1988 before joining FIFA, the Faroe Islands gameplay was limited to national friendly matches against Iceland, Shetland, Orkney Islands, Greenland and Denmark U-21. None of these matches was sanctioned by FIFA, nor the Faroe Islands Football Association.

The Faroe Islands tied Iceland for the most successful team at the friendly Greenland Cup tournament with two wins back-to-back in 1983 and 1984.

International membership and the miracle of Landskrona (1988–1993)

The FSF gained FIFA membership on 2 July 1988 and the team's first official victory was a 1–0 win in a friendly match against Canada the next year. The next year, the FSF joined the UEFA on 18 April 1990.

The Faroe Islands participated in two Island Games, winning both tournaments in 1989 and 1991. They never entered the tournament again, as the opponent teams were considered too weak a match for the Faroese side.

The Faroe Islands made football history on 12 September 1990 when they beat Austria 1–0 in their first-ever competitive international. The game, a Euro 92 qualifier, was played in Landskrona, Sweden because there were no grass pitches on the Faroe Islands at the time. Torkil Nielsen—a salesman for his local building company—scored the lone game-winning goal. 32-year-old national coach Páll Guðlaugsson became a folk hero overnight and is today remembered by his players as a fearless character who believed, against the odds, that the Faroe Islands could get a result against their bigger nation opponents. In his autobiography, national goalkeeper Jens Martin Knudsen revealed that Guðlaugsson gave a stirring pre-match speech that boosted the team's confidence prior to the match against the Austrians. Guðlaugsson told the players, "Think of the Faroese flag. Your flag. Take it with you on that field. Throw yourself into the tackles against those arrogant Austrians with one mission—to win the game for your nation. Tonight you pay back your childhood home. You have the opportunity now and it is an irreparable blow if you don't seize it!" The team's underdog win remains the story most often retold about Faroese football  and sports in the Faroe Islands. The Faroese victory was rated number 10 of all-time football greatest upsets by American sports magazine Soccerphile.

One month later, the Faroe Islands lost 4–1 to Denmark at Parken, Copenhagen. The same team got another good result in the qualifying tournament on 1 May 1991, when they drew 1–1 against Northern Ireland at Windsor Park. However, the Faroe Islands subsequently lost the remaining five matches of the tournament.

The Allan Simonsen years (1994–2001)
Since Landskrona, Faroese football continued its upward trajectory, regularly getting good results against stronger teams. However, it was a surprise to many around Europe when—in 1994—Allan Simonsen was appointed the new coach for the Faroese national team. Many thought that after a shining playing career at Borussia Mönchengladbach and F.C. Barcelona, the European footballer of the year in 1977 was too big a name for such a small nation. Allan Simonsen spent seven years at the team's helm and is remembered as the coach who lifted the Faroese amateurs to a more professional level of play.

As a coach, he asked the FSF to lengthen the season and the Faroese clubs for screen players for talent. Both requests were granted and have become an essential part of the Faroese national team's success at the highest level of the sport.

Under the guidance of Allan Simonsen, the Faroe Islands won two Euro 1996 qualifiers matches against San Marino 3–0 and 3–1. Two years later, in the 1998 World Cup Qualifiers, the team won two 2–1 matches against Malta. In the  Euro 2000 qualifiers, they played three draws—Lithuania 0–0, Scotland 1–1, and Bosnia 2–2. In 2002, the team played a 2–2 draw against Slovenia for their most successful 2002 World Cup Qualifying matches until 2018.

The Henrik Larsen years (2002–2005)
When looking for a new coach, it was important for the Football Association to secure a well-known and respected name in Europe. They found that in former Danish international and UEFA Euro 1992-winning player, Henrik Larsen, who succeeded his countryman Allan Simonsen, as head coach of the Faroe Islands national team.

On 7 September 2002, in the first match with Larsen as a coach, an experienced Faroese team played Scotland at home in a Euro 2004 qualifier. Though the Faroe Islands led Scotland 2–0 at halftime, the game ended in a 2–2 draw.

In the same qualifying tournament on 16 October 2002 at the HDI-Arena  in Hannover, the Faroe Islands were close to a big upset against Germany. Unfortunately for the Faroese, the post denied them a draw in the dying seconds of the match, and the game ended 2–1 for the German side. However, the Faroe Islands managed one more draw against Cyprus on 9 October 2004 in the 2006 World Cup Qualifying match.

The Jógvan Martin Olsen years (2006–2008)
In 2006, the Faroe Islands finally got their first Faroese coach in Jógvan Martin Olsen from Toftir, who had served as an assistant coach for the Faroese national team for nine years prior to his appointment. That same year, many experienced players who had been regulars on the national squad for years retired from the team, giving Olsen's the task of building a new squad with a new generation of players. The team's turnover and inexperience affected their results, and the Faroe Islands got zero points in the Euro 2008 qualifier, their first qualification match under Olsen as head coach.

However, in the 2 June 2007 game against Italy, the Faroes netted a 77th-minute goal and surprisingly took the sluggish world champions to the limit after a 2–1 loss. Overall, the Euro 2008 qualifying campaign was disastrous for the young team, as they conceded 43 goals and scored only four (all of which were scored by the same player, Rógvi Jacobsen), and half of which were against Italy en route to losing all twelve matches, of which three of were 6–0 defeats.

During the summer of 2008, the Faroese side played two friendlies. In the 4–3 loss to Estonia on 1 June 2008, and the team is credited with their only official international match in which they scored 3 goals but lost. Later they lost 5–0 to Portugal.

Olsen remained as a coach for the first four qualification matches in the 2010 World Cup Qualifiers. After announcing the squad against the Austrian national team, Olsen announced that he was stepping down after three years in charge. Before this departure, he finally managed to get a big result with the team on 11 October 2008 against Austria. The game ended 1–1, giving the Faroe Islands their first qualifying point in four years.

The Brian Kerr years and the new generation (2009–2011)
On 22 March 2009, the Faroese people got a glimpse of their future national team—a new generation of more technical and peaceful players— when they beat the Icelandic national team 2–1 in a friendly match, their first-ever victory over Iceland. Caretaker Heðin Askham managed the Faroese side in this match.

On 5 April 2009, former Republic of Ireland manager Brian Kerr was appointed new head coach of the team, with assistant manager Big Ed ‘the hammer’ Casey. With his charisma and Irish humour, he soon became a favourite among the Faroese football fans.

On 9 September 2009, the Faroe Islands recorded their first competitive win since the 2002 World Cup qualification stage, beating Lithuania 2–1.

On 11 August 2010, the Faroe Islands came close to an away win against Estonia during the UEFA Euro 2012 qualifiers. The Faroes took the lead in the first half with a goal by Jóan Símun Edmundsson. The score was still 1–0 after 90 minutes, but Estonia scored twice during stoppage time, and the Faroe Islands lost the match 2–1.

Two months later, on 12 October 2010, the Faroe Islands drew 1–1 against the higher-ranked Northern Ireland at Svangaskarð Stadion, Toftir. Striker Christian Holst scored for the Faroes in the 60th minute before Kyle Lafferty equalised 16 minutes later for the visiting side, earning a point for both teams.

On 7 June 2011, the Faroe Islands defeated Estonia 2–0 at Svangaskarð. Captain Fróði Benjaminsen opened the scoring from the penalty spot in the 43rd minute before Arnbjørn Hansen  secured the win with a follow-up after another Benjaminsen penalty. It was the Faroe Islands' first UEFA Euro qualification win since 1995.

The Faroe Islands were drawn against Kerr's former employers, the Republic of Ireland, in Group C for the 2014 World Cup Qualifying. The other teams in the group were Germany, Sweden, Austria, and Kazakhstan.

The players liked the Irishman and they described him as a very motivating figure. His pre-match speeches were full of passion and gave the players confidence to go out and play against the very best in Europe. However, on 26 October 2011, the Faroe Islands Football Association (FSF) announced that "it was not possible to agree on a new contract with Brian Kerr". Brian Kerr stepped down as coach after unsuccessful negotiations with the FSF.

The Lars Olsen years and the double Greek victory (2011–2019)

On 8 November 2011, the Faroese Football Association announced that an agreement had been reached with the 50-year-old former Denmark captain and European Champion from 1992, Lars Olsen, to become the next coach of the Faroe Islands and the third Dane at the helm, after Allan Simonsen and Henrik Larsen.

On 1 March 2014, for the first time in the Faroe Islands' history, the team scored four goals in a match. In what was only Gibraltar's second match as an official UEFA member, the hosts lost their first-ever home match by the score of 1–4. Faroe midfielder Christian Holst scored twice. On 11 October 2013, Olsen got his first point as the Faroe Islands head coach in a 1–1 draw against Kazakhstan.

On 25 September 2014, Faroese football lost one of its most promising football players, when 22-year-old Gunnar Zachariasen died in a tragic accident on board a Greenlandic fishing trawler, which had docked in Tórshavn in order to unload its cargo. The accident happened when a EUR-pallet stacked with frozen fish fell on top of Gunnar Zachariasen who died instantly. According to Rúni Nolsøe, Zachariasen's coach at EB/Streymur, Faroese football had lost a very good football player. He played 11 caps and scored 4 goals for the U21 Faroe Islands team.

On 14 November 2014, the Faroe Islands caused a major international football upset by defeating host Greece 0–1 during the Euro 2016 qualifiers. The Guardian reckoned the win as the biggest upset ever in terms of FIFA Rankings; Greece were ranked 18th, the Faroe Islands 187th, a 169-place difference.

On 13 June 2015, the Faroe Islands stunned the world yet again by defeating the same Greek side in their second meeting of the Euro 2016 qualifying tournament by a score of 2–1. These two wins saw the national team moving from 187th place to 74th place in the FIFA rankings. The team eventually finished fifth in their group with six points, without conceding more than three goals in a match.

On 29 March 2016, the Faroe Islands beat Liechtenstein 3–2 in a friendly match in Marbella, Spain. The opposition scored two late goals in stoppage time, but this was the Faroe Islands' fourth victory over Liechtenstein since 2000.

On 6 September 2016, the Faroe Islands draw 0–0 against Hungary in a 2018 World Cup Qualifying match at Tórsvøllur.

On 10 October 2016, the Faroe Islands defeated Latvia 2–0 in a 2018 World Cup Qualifying match.

On 3 September 2017, the Faroe Islands defeated Andorra 1–0 in a 2018 World Cup Qualifying match on home soil, beating their own record which was 7 points in a Euro or World Cup qualification; after the victory over Andorra the Faroe Islands reached a record nine points in all competitions.

On 18 November 2019, Lars Olsen led his team to a 0–3 loss against Sweden, in his last international match as the manager for the Faroe Islands. He's regarded as the most successful manager in the nation's 29-year history, as members of UEFA and FIFA. In the same match, captain Atli Gregersen retired from international duties as well, after winning 59 caps for the national team.

The Håkan Ericson years (2019–)
On 16 December 2019, the Faroe Islands Football Association announced they had signed a four-year deal with Swedish coach Håkan Ericson.

On 3 September 2020, in what would be his first match in charge, Håkan Ericson's side won 3–2 against Malta in a 2020-21 UEFA Nations League match. Only three days later, in what would be the 200th competitive match for Faroe Islands since joining FIFA and UEFA back in 1988, they recorded their second win in a row with a 1–0 win over Andorra, their first double victory since a 2–1 win against Malta on 8 June 1997.

On 17 November 2020, Ericson's side won their first-ever competitive tournament, after a 1–1 draw against Malta secured them the top spot and promotion from the 2020–21 UEFA Nations League D, followed by a new record of 12 points in all competitions, beating the previous 2018 FIFA World Cup qualification (UEFA) record at 9 points.

On 7 June 2021, the Faroese national team recorded their biggest win ever in a 5–1 friendly against Liechtenstein in Tórshavn.

On 26 September 2022, the Faroese national team defied all odds when beating Turkey 2–1 in the last game of the 2022–23 UEFA Nations League campaign. The win pushed their unbeaten record to four games, the longest streak in their history, and the result was arguably their best since the Greek Double victories of 2014 and 2015 respectively, although unlike the double Greek victories, the win against Turkey proved meaningless as Turkey has already won promotion earlier.

As of 26 September 2022, the Faroese national team has thirteen full-time professionals playing in Belgian, Norwegian, Danish, Swedish and Icelandic leagues, compared to the 1990 team who won the Austria game in Landskrona, which was entirely made up of amateurs.

Stadiums

Between 1999 and 2011, the Faroe Islands rotated its home matches between two different stadiums, Tórsvøllur and Svangaskarð. Their latest match in Svangaskarð was a 2–0 victory in a UEFA Euro 2012 qualifying match against Estonia on 7 June 2011.

Tórsvøllur has since undergone comprehensive renovation, transforming it into a multifunctional venue for concerts and sports in general, although it is primarily used for football. Floodlights were introduced in 2011, and 6,000 new seats were installed, all under roof. The stadium has been resurfaced with artificial grass and now meets all UEFA and FIFA demands.

Work on Tórsvøllur was completed in 2021.

Supporters

Faroe Islands have a main stand for their supporters at Tórsvøllur, which is known as "Skansin", meaning fort in English. Skansin was formed in 2014, following their 1–0 away victory against Greece in Pireaus and the opening of their newly renovated stadium.

As of September 2021, Skansin has 600 members domestically, and stand tickets are sold out every home match. Following Northern Ireland's 3–1 victory against Faroe Islands during the Euro 2016 qualifiers on 4 September 2015, Northern Ireland forward Kyle Lafferty stated that he was particularly impressed with the Faroese supporters, as they cheered for their players throughout the entire match, even when the Faroes threw away a likely 1–1 result.

Drums, trumpets and folksongs are an essential part of their support.

Results and fixtures

2022

2023

Coaching staff

.

Coaching history

 after the game against Turkey.
Friendly matches included.

Players

Current squad
 The following players were called up for the UEFA Euro 2024 qualifying match against  and the friendly against  on March 24 and 27, 2023.
 Caps and goals correct as of: 19 November 2022, after their match against .

Recent call-ups
The following players have been called up within the last 12 months.

INJ = Withdrew due to an injury
PRE = Preliminary squad
RET = Retired from the national team
WD = Withdrew due to non-injury issues

Records

Players in bold are still active with Faroe Islands.

Most capped players

Top goalscorers

Competitive record

FIFA World Cup

UEFA European Championship

UEFA Nations League

Island Games

Notable matches
Friendly matches not included.

FIFA ranking history
Source:

All-time record

Honours
UEFA Nations League:

League D, Group D1:

 Winners: 2020

Island Games:

 Winners 1989, 1991

See also

Faroe Islands national under-21 football team
Faroe Islands women's national football team

Notes

References

External links

 
 RSSSF archive of results 1930–2008
 RSSSF Record of Faroese International Players
 UEFA.com
 Footballsupporters.fo (12. Maður – "12th Man", the supporters of the Faroe Islands national football team)

 
European national association football teams